Trebanos is an electoral ward of Neath Port Talbot county borough, Wales, part of the Pontardawe community.

Trebanos includes some or all of the following areas: Trebanos, Craig Trebanos and Pontardawe, in the parliamentary constituency of Neath.  Trebanos is bounded by the wards of Pontardawe to the north and east; Alltwen to the southeast; and Clydach of Swansea to the south and west.  Trebanos includes open moorland and has a developed strip in the centre of the ward which lies in the Swansea Valley.

In the 2017 local council elections, the electorate turnout was %.  The results were:

Electoral wards of Neath Port Talbot